Neven Jurica (born 4 April 1952) is a Croatian politician who worked in Croatian diplomacy between 1992 and 2009. Between February 2008 and September 2009 he was the Permanent Representative of Croatia to the United Nations.

Biography

Jurica has a degree in comparative literature and philosophy, and a Master of Arts in literary theory from the University of Zagreb. From 1980 to 1989, he worked as a writer and published in excess of 16 books on literary theory and criticism.  At the same time, he oversaw a literary forum, "Literary Friday".

In 1990 he was a founding member of the Croatian Democratic Union and served as Political Secretary.  Following the first democratic elections in Croatia in 1990, he was elected to the Parliament and served as Chairman of the Human Rights Committee (1990–1992).

Jurica has served as the Croatian Ambassador to Australia and New Zealand between 1992 and December 1995. He was the Ambassador in Bulgaria (1996–1997) and Norway (1998–2000). He was the Croatian Ambassador to the United States of America between 2004 and 2008.

Between 2003 and 2004 he was the Chairman of the Foreign Affairs Committee of the Croatian Parliament.

As the Permanent Representative to the UN, he represented Croatia in the United Nations Security Council and served as the President of the council in December 2008.

After being replaced as the Representative to the UN, the Croatian anti-corruption agency USKOK brought charges against Jurica for embezzlement of US$120,000. Jurica has described his finance as "chaotic" and reimbursed the Ministry of Foreign Affairs for the amount in question, but maintained that the money was not used for personal gain. On 22 April 2010, after a trial at the County Court in Zagreb, Jurica was sentenced to 18 months of prison.

Jurica holds membership in the Croatian Writers' Association and P.E.N. (Poets, Essayists, and Novelists).

He is married with two children.

See also
List of Permanent Representatives to the UN
Croatian War of Independence

References

External links
United Nation Press Release Presentation of Credentials: Jurica

1952 births
Living people
Representatives in the modern Croatian Parliament
Permanent Representatives of Croatia to the United Nations
Croatian Democratic Union politicians
Faculty of Humanities and Social Sciences, University of Zagreb alumni
Ambassadors of Croatia to Australia
Ambassadors of Croatia to Bulgaria
Ambassadors of Croatia to Norway
Ambassadors of Croatia to the United States
Ambassadors of Croatia to New Zealand